Ismail Sillakh (born February 9, 1985 in Zaporizhia) is a Ukrainian professional boxer who has medaled in important international tournaments as an amateur.

Amateur career
Ismail Sillakh was born in Zaporizhia, then he moved with his family to Industrial city of Mariupol (one of most important port cities in Ukraine) His parents — Mohammad of Sierra Leone and Natalya, a Ukraine native—met in college and had no particular connection to boxing but he took up the sport at a local recreation center at age seven and quickly discovered that he had the athletic ability to excel at it. In Mariupol he went to the boxing club of City's Metal Construction Factory of the name of Lenin. He was trained by one of the best city's boxing coaches. In Ismayl's career has played big role his old brother Adjick Sillakh. Adjick Sillakh was for years one of the best masters in Ukrainian amateur boxing, Ismayl gained good experience by boxing with his older brother Adjick. He began competing at age nine and was recognized as one of Ukraine’s better amateurs a few years later before establishing himself as one of Europe’s premier open-class boxers. Ismayl Sillakh had been a world-ranked amateur for two years going into the 2007 World Amateur Boxing Championships in Chicago where he lost a close and spirited slug-fest to the more mature Christopher Downs.

Amateur highlights
Amateur Record: 302-16

2001 (October 11–21) Gold Medalist World Cadet Championships in Baku, Azerbaijan, boxing as a Welterweight (67 kg):
Round of 16 - Defeated Robert Blazo (Slovakia)
Quarterfinal - Defeated Rodriguez (Cuba)
Semifinal - Defeated Artur Beterbiyev (Russia)
Final - Defeated Elchin Alizade (Azerbaijan)

2005 (November 13–20) Silver Medalist World Championships in Mianyang, China, boxing as a Middleweight (75 kg):
Round of 32 - Defeated Nabil Kassel (Algeria) RSCI
Round of 16 - Defeated Donatas Bondorovas (Lithuania) RSCI 1
Quarterfinal - Defeated Mamadou Diambang (France) RSCO
Semifinal - Defeated Mohamed Hikal (Egypt) 28-22
Final - Lost to Matvey Korobov (Russia) RSCO 2

2006 (July 14–23) Silver Medalist European Championships in Plovdiv, Bulgaria, boxing as a Light-Heavyweight (81 kg):
Round of 32 - Defeated David Tsiklauri (Georgia) RSC 1
Round of 16 - Defeated Andrey Miruk (Belarus) RSCO 2
Quarterfinal - Defeated Imre Szello (Hungary) RSCI 1
Semifinal - Defeated Constantin Bejenaru (Romania) RSCO 3
Final - Lost to Artur Beterbiyev (Russia) 23-34

Pro
As a pro he is managed by Ivaylo Gotzev and trained by Shadeed Suluki.
In 2010 he KOd Daniel Judah for his first minor title (NABF), in 2011 he beat the undefeated Cuban Yordanis Despaigne by unanimous decision. After 17 wins he suffered a setback against undefeated but unsung Denis Grachev, after scoring a knockdown he got careless in the 8th round and Grachev knocked him out, Sillakh's chin looked somewhat suspect. He has won four comeback bouts to go to 21-1, but was knocked out by Sergey Kovalev in the second round of their title bout, leaving Sillakh with two career losses.

Professional boxing record

| style="text-align:center;" colspan="8"|27 Wins (21 Knockouts), 7 Losses, 0 Draws
|-  style="text-align:center; background:#e3e3e3;"
|  style="border-style:none none solid solid; "|Res.
|  style="border-style:none none solid solid; "|Record
|  style="border-style:none none solid solid; "|Opponent
|  style="border-style:none none solid solid; "|Type
|  style="border-style:none none solid solid; "|Rd., Time
|  style="border-style:none none solid solid; "|Date
|  style="border-style:none none solid solid; "|Location
|  style="border-style:none none solid solid; "|Notes
|- align=center
|Loss
|25–6
|align=left| Andrzej Fonfara
|
|
|
|align=left|
|align=left|
|- align=center
|Loss
|25–5
|align=left| Aleksei Papin
|
|
|
|align=left|
|align=left|
|- align=center
|Loss
|25–4
|align=left| Mateusz Masternak
|
|
|
|align=left|
|align=left|
|- align=center
|Win
|23-2
|align=left| Giorgi Tevdorashvili
|
|
|
|align=left|
|align=left|
|- align=center
|Win
|22-2
|align=left| Arturs Kulikauskis
|
|
|
|align=left|
|align=left|
|- align=center
|Loss
|21-2
|align=left| Sergey Kovalev
|
|
|
|align=left|
|align=left|
|- align=center
|Win
|21-1
|align=left| Konstantin Piternov
|
|
|
|align=left|
|align=left|
|- align=center
|Win
|20-1
|align=left| Alvaro Enriquez
|
|
|
|align=left|
|align=left|
|- align=center
|Win
|19-1
|align=left| Mitch Williams
|
|
|
|align=left|
|align=left|
|- align=center
|Win
|18-1
|align=left| Daniel Adotey Allotey
|
|
|
|align=left|
|align=left|
|- align=center
|Loss
|17-1
|align=left| Denis Grachev
|
|
|
|align=left|
|align=left|
|- align=center
|Win
|17-0
|align=left| Ali Ismailov
|
|
|
|align=left|
|align=left|
|- align=center
|Win
|16-0
|align=left| Hamza Wandera
|
|
|
|align=left|
|align=left|
|- align=center
|Win
|15-0
|align=left| Yordanis Despaigne
|
|
|
|align=left|
|align=left|
|- align=center
|Win
|14-0
|align=left| Rayco Saunders
|
|
|
|align=left|
|align=left|
|- align=center
|Win
|13-0
|align=left| Jevgenijs Andrejevs
|
|
|
|align=left|
|align=left|
|- align=center
|Win
|12-0
|align=left| Daniel Judah
|
|
|
|align=left|
|align=left|
|- align=center
|Win
|11-0
|align=left| Larry Pryor
|
|
|
|align=left|
|align=left|
|- align=center
|Win
|10-0
|align=left| Julius Jackson
|
|
|
|align=left|
|align=left|
|- align=center
|Win
|9-0
|align=left| Ray Smith
|
|
|
|align=left|
|align=left|
|- align=center
|Win
|8-0
|align=left| David Whittom
|
|
|
|align=left|
|align=left|
|- align=center
|Win
|7-0
|align=left| Carlos Reyes
|
|
|
|align=left|
|align=left|
|- align=center
|Win
|6-0
|align=left| Jose Humberto Corral	
|
|
|
|align=left|
|align=left|
|- align=center
|Win
|5-0
|align=left| Dewayne Warren
|
|
|
|align=left|
|align=left|
|- align=center
|Win
|4-0
|align=left| Armen Azizian
|
|
|
|align=left|
|align=left|
|- align=center
|Win
|3-0
|align=left| Walter Edwards
|
|
|
|align=left|
|align=left|
|- align=center
|Win
|2-0
|align=left| Jose Grace
|
|
|
|align=left|
|align=left|
|- align=center
|Win
|1-0
|align=left| Matt Halvorsen
|
|
|
|align=left|
|align=left|

References

External links
2001

1985 births
Sportspeople from Zaporizhzhia
Ukrainian people of Sierra Leonean descent
Light-heavyweight boxers
Living people
Ukrainian male boxers
AIBA World Boxing Championships medalists